Badiaria plagiata is a species of moth of the family Tortricidae. It is found in Cotopaxi Province, Ecuador.

The wingspan is about 21 mm. The ground colour of the forewings is whitish suffused with pinkish ferruginous except for the lines edging the markings and a streak perpendicular to the mid-termen. The markings are rust with black elements. The hindwings are cream with grey spots.

Etymology
The species name refers to markings of the forewing and is derived from Greek plagios (meaning transverse, oblique).

References

Moths described in 2008
Euliini
Moths of South America
Taxa named by Józef Razowski